Bruce James Cassidy (born May 20, 1965), nicknamed "Butch", is a Canadian hockey coach and former professional ice hockey player. He is the current head coach of the Vegas Golden Knights of the National Hockey League (NHL). He has previously served as the head coach of the Washington Capitals and Boston Bruins. As a defenceman, he played for the Chicago Blackhawks in the NHL.

Playing career
Cassidy was a defenceman who played in the Ontario Hockey League (OHL) with the Ottawa 67's from 1982 to 1985, and he was selected by the Chicago Black Hawks of the National Hockey League (NHL) in the 1983 NHL Entry Draft, selected in the first round, 18th overall. Cassidy's best OHL season was in 1982–83, when he registered 25 goals and 86 assists for 111 points. He won the Memorial Cup under coach Brian Kilrea in 1984 scoring 12 points. At age 19, he made his NHL debut with the Black Hawks in March 1984. From 1984 to 1988, he had three knee surgeries, including major reconstruction of his ACL.

Between 1985 and 1990, Cassidy would spend most of his time in the Black Hawks' minor league system, playing with the Nova Scotia Oilers of the American Hockey League (AHL), the Saginaw Generals of the International Hockey League (IHL), the Saginaw Hawks of the IHL and the Indianapolis Ice, also in the IHL.

Cassidy's NHL playing career was limited due to his knee surgeries. He would also play 36 games with the Blackhawks during those years, scoring 4 goals and adding 13 assists for 17 points, along with 10 penalty minutes.

After winning the Turner Cup in the IHL, Cassidy signed with Alleghe HC in Italy and played two years with the club 1990–1992 and 1992–1993 in the Italian Ice Hockey League, appearing in 51 games and earning 117 points (35 goals and 82 assists).

After his stint in Italy, Cassidy then spent the 1993–94 season with Kaufbeuren of the German Hockey League, earning 17 points (8 goals and 9 assists) in 35 games.

Cassidy then returned to the Blackhawks organization with the Indianapolis Ice from 1994 to 1997 before retiring as a player ten games into the 1996–97 season to take a head coaching job with the Jacksonville Lizard Kings of the ECHL mid-season.

Coaching career

Jacksonville Lizard Kings (1996–1998)
Cassidy retired as a player with the Indianapolis Ice of the IHL to become head coach of the Jacksonville Lizard Kings of the ECHL in 1996–97. Cassidy took over the team which started the year 6–12–2, and led them to a 15–25–10 record.

The Lizard Kings greatly improved in Cassidy's second year with the team, finishing with a 35–29–6 record for 76 points.

In 2021, one of his former players referenced him in a throwback game to the Lizard Kings. Greg Capson (1969-present) played for the Lizard Kings in its beginning years and was used as someone who would "take care of the little ones", according to Brubaker.

Indianapolis Ice (1998–1999)
In 1998–99, Cassidy was promoted to head coach of the Indianapolis Ice of the IHL, the club finished the year at 33–37–12 for 78 points and qualified for the playoffs. In the first round, they played the heavily favoured Cincinnati Cyclones in a best of three series, and the Cyclones won Game 1 4–2. The Ice came back and won Game 2 4–3 in overtime, and then took the series by winning 1–0 in Game 3 in Cincinnati. In the second round, the Ice fell three games to one to the Detroit Vipers and were eliminated from the playoffs.

Trenton Titans (1999–2000)
As the Ice folded after the 1998–99 season, Cassidy took the head coaching job with the expansion Trenton Titans of the ECHL, leading them to a 37–29–4 record, good for fourth place in the Northeast Division. The Titans made short work of the Richmond Renegades in the first round, sweeping them three games to none. In the second round, they faced off against the Hampton Roads Admirals, and beat them three games to two. The Titans would then fall four games to two to the Peoria Rivermen, in the semi-finals.

Grand Rapids Griffins (2000–2002)
Cassidy then moved to the Detroit Red Wings organization to become head coach of the Grand Rapids Griffins of the IHL. The club finished with the best record in the league (53–22–7 for 113 points), and they swept the Cleveland Lumberjacks in four games before falling to the Orlando Solar Bears in six games in the semi-finals.

Cassidy returned to Grand Rapids for the 2001–02 season, leading them to another division title with a 42–27–11 (95 points) record, but the team lost in the first round to the Chicago Wolves in five games.

Washington Capitals (2002–2004)
The Washington Capitals of the NHL took notice of Cassidy's success in the minors and hired him to become the head coach of the club in 2002–03. The Capitals finished in second place in the Southeast with a 39–29–8–6 (92 points) record, were seeded sixth in the Eastern Conference and faced the third-seeded Tampa Bay Lightning in the opening round of the 2003 Stanley Cup playoffs. The Capitals won the first two games in Tampa Bay, but the Lightning rebounded and won four straight games to eliminate the Capitals.

Cassidy returned as head coach in 2003–04. However, just 25 games into the season with an 8–16–1 record, he was fired and replaced by assistant coach Glen Hanlon. The club would go on and finish with the third-worst record in the NHL under Hanlon (23–46–10–3 for 59 points), but won the draft lottery and chose Alexander Ovechkin with their first overall pick in the 2004 NHL Entry Draft.

Chicago Blackhawks (2004–2006)
Cassidy signed on as an assistant coach with the Chicago Blackhawks in June 2004. With the NHL lockout cancelling the 2004–05 season, Cassidy was behind the Blackhawks bench as an assistant to head coach Trent Yawney for the 2005–06 season. The Blackhawks struggled to a 26–43–13 record, earning 65 points and missed the 2006 playoffs. Cassidy's contract was not renewed. Because the team finished poorly, Cassidy's former team again secured a draft lottery pick following his departure, selecting Jonathan Toews with the third overall pick.

Kingston Frontenacs (2006–2008)
Cassidy was hired by the OHL's Kingston Frontenacs on July 12, 2006. On September 10, 2006, in a pre-season exhibition game between Kingston and the Ottawa 67's, Cassidy got the chance to coach against his former coach and mentor Kilrea; the Frontenacs lost 4–3, thanks to Ottawa's three-point men Matt Lahey and Thomas Kiriakou, who each had two goals and an assist. During the regular season, Cassidy quickly rebounded in the home opener and beat his former proud mentor by 9–5.

During his first season as head coach, the Frontenacs would finish with a 31–30–7 record, earning them 69 points and fifth place in the Eastern Conference. The Fronts would face the Oshawa Generals in the first round of the playoffs, but would be eliminated in five games.

Cassidy returned to Kingston to begin the 2007–08 season. However, after a rough 2–9–1 start to the season, he was fired and replaced by Larry Mavety. Cassidy finished with a 33–39–8 record with the club.

Providence Bruins (2008–2016)
Cassidy joined the Providence Bruins of the AHL as an assistant coach in the 2008–09 season under head coach Rob Murray. Cassidy held this position for three years before being promoted to head coach of the team for the 2011–12 season after Murray was fired.

During his first season as head coach, the club posted a 35–34–7 record, earning 77 points and failing to qualify for the playoffs.

In his second season with Providence in 2012–13, the Bruins had the best record in the AHL, going 50–21–5 for 105 points, securing first place in the Atlantic Division. In the first round of the playoffs, the Bruins defeated the Hershey Bears in five games, setting up a second-round series against the Wilkes-Barre/Scranton Penguins. Providence took a commanding 3–0 lead in the best-of-seven series, however, the Penguins mounted a comeback, and won the final four games to upset the Bruins in seven games.

Providence made the playoffs once again in 2013–14, finishing with a 40–25–11 record, earning 91 points and seventh place in the Eastern Conference. In the first round, the Bruins upset the second seeded Springfield Falcons in five games, before again losing to the Wilkes-Barre/Scranton Penguins in seven games in the second round.

In 2014–15, Cassidy led the Bruins to their third consecutive season with 40 or more victories, as Providence earned a 41–26–9 record, getting 91 points, as the club finished in sixth place in the Eastern Conference. In the playoffs, the Bruins lost to the Hartford Wolf Pack in five games, losing the final game in overtime to be eliminated.

During the 2015–16 season, Cassidy led the team to a 41–22–13 record with them finishing in fourth place in the Eastern Conference during the regular season. The team lost the Division Semifinals to Wilkes-Barre/Scranton Penguins in three games.

Boston Bruins (2016–2022)
On May 24, 2016, Cassidy joined the Boston Bruins as assistant coach for the 2016–17 season. On February 7, 2017, he was named interim head coach after head coach Claude Julien was fired, and on April 26, the Bruins named him the new head coach. In his first full year as Bruins head coach, he led the team to a 50–20–12 regular season record, collecting 112 points and securing the second seed in the Atlantic Division. In the playoffs, his team defeated their rivals, the Toronto Maple Leafs, 4–3 and advanced to the second round against the Tampa Bay Lightning, losing in five games.

In the 2018–19 season, Cassidy led the Bruins to an appearance in the 2019 Stanley Cup Finals, where the team lost to the St. Louis Blues in seven games. On September 11, 2019, he signed a multi-year contract extension.

In the shortened 2019–20 season, Cassidy coached the Bruins to a 44–14–12 record for 100 points, capturing the Presidents' Trophy for the third time in franchise history. The Bruins went on to lose to the Tampa Bay Lightning in the second round for the second time in three seasons. In the off-season, Cassidy was named the winner of the 2019–20 Jack Adams Award, given to the best NHL coach annually.

On June 6, 2022, the Bruins relieved Cassidy of his head coaching duties  after a Game seven loss to the Carolina Hurricanes during the 2022 Stanley Cup playoffs.

Vegas Golden Knights (2022–present)
On June 14, 2022, eight days after getting fired by the Bruins, Cassidy was hired by the Vegas Golden Knights as the third head coach in franchise history. He replaced Peter DeBoer.

Personal life
Cassidy and his wife have two children. He also has a son from a prior relationship who is a college student at Vanderbilt University. Cassidy has been given the nickname "Butch", after Wild West outlaw Butch Cassidy, and has been referred to as such by players on many occasions.

Career statistics

Regular season and playoffs

International

Head coaching record

NHL

Minor leagues

References

External links

1965 births
Living people
Boston Bruins coaches
Canadian ice hockey coaches
Canadian ice hockey defencemen
Chicago Blackhawks draft picks
Chicago Blackhawks players
ECHL coaches
Grand Rapids Griffins coaches
Ice hockey people from Ottawa
Jack Adams Award winners
Kingston Frontenacs coaches
National Hockey League first-round draft picks
Ottawa 67's players
Providence Bruins coaches
Vegas Golden Knights coaches
Washington Capitals coaches